The men's decathlon at the 1962 European Athletics Championships was held in Belgrade, then Yugoslavia, at JNA Stadium on 13 and 14 September 1962.

Medalists

Results

Final
13/14 September

Participation
According to an unofficial count, 17 athletes from 11 countries participated in the event.

 (1)
 (1)
 (2)
 (1)
 (1)
 (1)
 (1)
 (1)
 (3)
 (3)
 (2)

References

Decathlon
Combined events at the European Athletics Championships